The CineMAA Awards  are presented annually by the Maa TV Group to honour artistic and technical excellence of professionals in the Telugu Cinema. The awards were introduced in 2004. The CineMAA Awards are voted for by both the public and a committee of experts as per meritocracy.

Each year one Life Time Achievement Award is presented to one of the accomplished veterans from the Industry. The award ceremony is telecasted live over MAA TV from the Hyderabad International Convention Center of the Novotel Group in Hyderabad. In 2013,  Telugu cinema category, for Best Actor and Actress was introduced for the first time.

Popular awards

Best Film
The CineMAA Award for Best Film is chosen via the public of Andhra Pradesh and Telangana. The winners are listed below:

Best Director
The CineMAA Award for Best Director is chosen via the public of Andhra Pradesh and Telangana. The winners are listed below:

Best Actor - Male

The CineMAA Award for Best Actor - Male is chosen via the public of Andhra Pradesh and Telangana. The winners are listed below:

Best Actor - Female

The CineMAA Award for Best Actor- Female is chosen via the public of Andhra Pradesh and Telangana. The winners are listed below:

Best Actor - Male (Tamil)
The CineMAA Award for Best Actor - Male (Tamil) is chosen via the public of Andhra Pradesh. The winners are listed below:

Best Actor - Female (Tamil)
The CineMAA Award for Best Actor - Female (Tamil) is chosen via the public of Andhra Pradesh. The winners are listed below:

Best Outstanding Actor
The CineMAA Award for Best Outstanding Actor is chosen via the public of Andhra Pradesh and Telangana. The winners are listed below:

Best Outstanding Actress
The CineMAA Award for Best Outstanding Actress is chosen via the public of Andhra Pradesh and Telangana. The winners are listed below:

Best Face of The Year
The CineMAA Award for Best Face of The Year is chosen via the public of Andhra Pradesh and Telangana. The winners are listed below:

Best Villain
The CineMAA Award for Best Villain is chosen via the public of Andhra Pradesh and Telangana. The winners are listed below:

Best Comedian
The CineMAA Award for Best Comedian is chosen via the public of Andhra Pradesh and Telangana. The winners are listed below:

Best Music Director
The CineMAA Award for Best Music Director is chosen via the public of Andhra Pradesh and Telangana. The winners are listed below:

Best Male Debut
The CineMAA Award for Best Male Debut is chosen via the public of Andhra Pradesh and Telangana. The winners are listed below:

Best Female Debut
The CineMAA Award for Best Female Debut is chosen via the public of Andhra Pradesh and Telangana. The winners are listed below:

Best Debut Director
The CineMAA Award for Best Debut Director  is chosen via the public of Andhra Pradesh and Telangana. The winners are listed below:

Best Lyricist
The CineMAA Award for Best Lyricist is chosen via the public of Andhra Pradesh and Telangana. The winners are listed below:

Best Editor
The CineMAA Award for Best Editor is chosen via the public of Andhra Pradesh and Telangana. The winners are listed below:

Best Costume Designer
The CineMAA Award for Best Costume Designer is chosen via the public of Andhra Pradesh and Telangana. The winners are listed below:

Best Fight Master
The CineMAA Award for Best Fight Master is chosen via the public of Andhra Pradesh and Telangana. The winners are listed below:

Best Visual Effects
The CineMAA Award for Best Visual Effects is chosen via the public of Andhra Pradesh and Telangana. The winners are listed below:

Best Art Director
The CineMAA Award for Best Art Director is chosen via the public of Andhra Pradesh and Telangana. The winners are listed below:

Best Screenplay
The CineMAA Award for Best Screenplay is chosen via the public of Andhra Pradesh and Telangana. The winners are listed below:

Best Dialogue
The CineMAA Award for Best Dialogue is chosen via the public of Andhra Pradesh and Telangana. The winners are listed below:

Best Story
The CineMAA Award for Best Story is chosen via the public of Andhra Pradesh and Telangana. The winners are listed below:

Best Male Playback Singer

Best Female Playback Singer

Best Choreographer

Critic's awards

Best Actor (Jury)

Best Actress (Jury)
The CineMAA Award for Best Actress (Jury) is chosen by a selected panel of eminent film personalities. The award is given to the leading actress whose performance is recognised by the jury members as well as the critics. Past winners are:

Best Director (Jury)

Best Film (Jury)

Special Jury

Best Supporting Actor

Best Supporting Actress

Special Appreciation
2016 Krish - Kanche
2016 Gunasekhar - Rudhramadevi
2003 Vikram - Sivaputrudu

Lifetime Contribution
The CineMAA Award for Life Time Contribution is chosen via the public of Andhra Pradesh and Telangana. The winners are listed below:

See also
 Tollywood
 Cinema of India
 Telugu Book of Records Holder Link : http://www.telugubookofrecords.com/home/dedicating-most-number-of-telugu-and-other-regional-languages-movies/

References

External links
 
 CineMAA Awards 2002
 CineMAA Awards 2003
 CineMAA Awards 2004
 CineMAA Awards 2008
 CineMAA Awards 2010
 CineMAA Awards 2011
 CineMAA Awards 2012
 CineMAA Awards 2013
 – presentation-event-Photos-Stills CineMAA Awards 2015 Function

 
Awards established in 2004
2004 establishments in India
Telugu film awards